Maria Clara at Ibarra is a Philippine television drama fantasy series broadcast by GMA Network. The series is based on the novels of José Rizal: Noli Me Tángere and El Filibusterismo. Directed by Zig Dulay, it stars Barbie Forteza, Julie Anne San Jose and Dennis Trillo. It premiered on October 3, 2022 on the network's Telebabad line up replacing Lolong. The series concluded on February 24, 2023 with a total of 105 episodes. It was replaced by Mga Lihim ni Urduja in its timeslot.

The show features Klay Infantes, a Gen-Z nursing student who gets transported into the setting of Noli Me Tangere and El Filibusterismo. The series is streaming online on GMA Network's official website.

Cast and characters 
 Lead cast
 Barbie Forteza as María Clara "Klay" Infantes
 Julie Anne San Jose as María Clara "Clarita" de los Santos y Alba / Clarisse Torres
 Dennis Trillo as Juan Crisóstomo Ibarra y Magsalin / Simoun / Ibarra Gonzalo "Barry" Torres

Supporting cast
 David Licauco as Fidel de los Reyes y Maglipol
 Manilyn Reynes as Narcisa "Narsing" Infantes-Asunción
 Juancho Triviño as Padre Bernardo Salvi
 Rocco Nacino as Elías
 Tirso Cruz III as Padre Dámaso Verdolagas
 Dax Augustus as young Padre Dámaso
 Andrea Torres as Narcisa "Sisa"
 Juan Rodrigo as Santiago "Kapitán Tiago" de los Santos
 Ranty Portento as young Tiago
 Ces Quesada as Tía Isabel 
 Khalil Ramos as Basilio
 Stanley Abuloc as young Basilio 
 Pauline Mendoza as Juliana "Juli" de Dios 
 Arlhei Janmira Dapilos as young Juli
 Kim de Leon as Isagani
 Arnold Reyes as Telesforo "Kabesang Tales" de Dios 
 Julia Pascual as Paulita Gómez 
 Lou Veloso as Prof. José R. Torres
 Dennis Padilla as Adong Aglipay 
 Gilleth Sandico as Victorina de los Reyes de Espadaña
 Giovanni Baldisseri as the alférez 
 Raquel Pareño as Consolación
 Tanya Garcia as Pía Alba
 Carlos Siguion Reyna as the captain general during the Noli Me Tangere timeline
 Gino Ilustre as the captain general during the El Filibusterismo timeline
 Karenina Haniel as Victoria 
 Robert Ortega as Ronald Asunción 
 JM San Jose as Elías Infantes Asunción 
 Bobby Andrews as Antonio "Anton" Villarama 
 Charo Calalo as Geraldine Cruz-Villarama 
 Lei Angela Ollet as Anica Cruz Villarama 
 Lyra Micolob as Stacy Joaquín
 Jeniffer Maravilla as Sinang 
 Hannah Precillas as Iday 
 Ira Ruzz as Neneng 
 Kian Co as Crispín 
 Johnny Revilla as Teniente Miguel Guevara 
 Chai Fonacier as Lucía 
 Kirst Viray as Pablito
 Kiel Rodriguez as Renato
 Marlon Liwanag as the gravedigger
 Jovy Vieja as Andeng
 Francis Mata as Anastasio "Pilósopo Tasio" 
 Rain Matienzo as Salome 
 Roland Sanchez as the "yellow man"
 Roven Alejandro as Tiburcio de Espadaña 
 Brent Valdez as Alfonso Linares 
 Paul Jake Paule as Lucas
 Red Magno as Padre Sibyla 
 Elan Villafuerte as Kapitán Basilio 
 Janna Trias as Kapitána Tica
 Froilan Manto as Filipo Lino 
 Victor Sy as Rafael Ibarra 
 Edmund Dreu Santiago as the gobernadorcillo
 Archi Adamos as the alcalde
 Ian Segarra as the teacher
 Raion Sandoval as Pedro 
 Jo-Ann Morallos as the nun
 James Lomahan as a Guardia civil officer
 Arrian Labios as the leper
 Felicity Kyle Napuli as Tala
 Elle Ramirez as Pepay 
 Jon Lucas as Juanito Peláez
 Eddie Ngo as Quiroga
 Lucho Ayala as Abraham "Ben-Zayb" Ibañez
 Nanding Josef as Padre Florentino
 Raymond Gorospe as Padre Írene
 Don Umali as Padre Camorra
 Ces Aldaba as Custodio de Salazar
 Rosemarie Sarita as Sor Teresa
 Marnie Lapus as Martina
 Luri Vincent Nalus as Hernando
 Joanhna Bago as Hermana Penchang

Production

Development 

The show took three years in production and was pitched as early as September 2020, beginning around August to October 2019, based on the novels Noli Me Tángere and El filibusterismo. According to GMA Network's vice president for drama, Cheryl Ching-Sy, it was initially conceptualized by Atty. Annette Gozon - the network's senior vice president - as an adaptation of the novels around March 2019. Eventually, the creative team added a Gen Z character into the story to grab the attention of the young audiences. Head writer Suzette Doctolero was later brought in to develop the concept as "Noli Me Tángere with a modern twist". Although pre-production was delayed in 2020 when the COVID-19 pandemic struck the Philippines, it was nearly completed by early 2022.

It was slated to run for 20 weeks, from October 2022 to February 2023. Before its pilot week, supervising producer Helen Rose Sese mentioned that a second season was planned should the series become a hit.

With most of the story being set in 19th century Philippines during the Spanish colonial period, the show consulted historians Ramon Guillermo and Gonzalo Campoamor II for its set and costume design as well as the script. The 19th century scenes were filmed in multiple locations across Ilocos, Batangas, Laguna, Bulacan, Tanay, and Pampanga. Scenes including the exterior of the vintage houses were mostly shot in Ilocos Norte and Ilocos Sur, particularly in Sarrat, Santa Maria, Sitio Remedios, and Calle Crisólogo. The interior of Kapitan Tiago's house was shot in Taal, Batangas. The production design team built a bahay kubo to film scenes in Sisa's house, using vintage photos of old huts as references. While filming at Calle Crisólogo, the crew experienced an earthquake and production was temporarily halted.

Principal photography concluded on February 4, 2023.

Casting 
On July 8, 2022, it was announced that Barbie Forteza, Dennis Trillo, and Julie Anne San Jose were cast in an upcoming historical portal fantasy drama based on José Rizal's novels. The rest of the supporting cast was announced on August 3, which was followed by the first teaser on September 13.

The cast was coached by Roven Alejandro (who also plays Don Tiburcio De Espadaña, Doña Victorina's stuttering husband) for dialogues in the Spanish language. According to head writer and creative consultant Suzette Doctolero, San Jose's audition impressed the network's executives that they unanimously decided for her to take the role.

On January 16, 2023, the cast for the new characters in the El filibusterismo arc was announced during an online media conference, which included Khalil Ramos, Pauline Mendoza, Kim de Leon, and Julia Pascual. A teaser for the sequel arc was subsequently released in a new version of the opening theme's music video.

Costumes
Over 200 costumes were created for the series, including the pañuelo and traje de mestiza. The costumes were designed by Janra Raroque, Roko Arceo and Mikaella Borinaga. According to Raroque, seventy percent of the series' preparation went into researching for the production design, which was supervised by Gino Gonzales, the author of the book Fashionable Filipinas. During the initial costume concept designing, they focused on historical accuracy, avoiding neon colors and traveling to Lumban and Bulacan to find piña fabric manufacturers and designers respectively. Due to the rarity of expert Filipino costume designers in pre-colonial and Spanish period costumes, the stylists faced difficulties in searching for those in menswear clothes and jewelries. The character Elias's kattukong or tabungaw was crafted by Ilocano hatter Teofilo Garcia; they also had to find craftsmen specializing in gold tamburin and repoussé.

Each cast member had to wear multiple layers of clothing for their costumes - Trillo had to wear at least three layers. San Jose wore hair extensions to keep her hair styled up. The folds on Forteza's costumes change depending on the year, from the late 1860s to the early 1870s. San Jose and Forteza also learned the art of Abaniko for the series.

Reception
In its pilot week, the series received an average of 15.1 percent in the people's rating based on the AGB Nielsen Philippines TAM ratings data, while the second week received a rating of 14.8 percent. It also accumulated more than 130 million views on TikTok, while the first six episodes have garnered over one million views each on GMA Network's Facebook and YouTube pages.

The cast has also received praise for their acting. Many praised Juancho Triviño's portrayal of the eccentric parish priest Padre Salvi, finding the character and his balding appearance an annoyance. Triviño would later receive his first acting award nomination for his role at the 3rd Annual TAG Awards Chicago. Journalist Ricky Gallardo commended Barbie Forteza, who plays the main protagonist Klay, for evolving from "a dollish young star to a delightfully divine actress", regarding her as the brightest star of the season. Andrea Torres, who plays Sisa, received positive reception for her depiction of the character during a six-minute scene of her descent into insanity. Dennis Trillo, the actor for one of the show's main character and Noli Me Tangere'''s main protagonist Crisostomo Ibarra, was also applauded for his delivery of the character's speech on patriotism in the series' seventieth episode.

Historian Xiao Chua has applauded the series' adaptation of Rizal's works despite some departure from the original novels, commending the addition of Klay as a character that "gives excitement." In a column for The Manila Times, he also described Torres's portrayal of Sisa as a performance that "made [him] cry so much" and "[feel] her pain and her love, [which] is what the founders of the nation felt reading Rizal for the first time."

Since its release, there has been a growing interest in the Noli Me Tángere and El filibusterismo novels among Filipino teachers and students.

Due to its popularity among viewers, the series was extended an additional week, moving its final episode from February 17 to February 24, 2023.

Episodes
<onlyinclude>

Accolades

Green Zeal Award of Excellence
Aside from winning the Most Outstanding Teleserye award at De La Salle Araneta University's Gawad Lasallianeta 2023, the show also received the Green Zeal Award of Excellence in Bridging Boundaries through Culture and Arts. The special recognition is only given to organizations, companies, or groups that are able to promote certain advocacies effectively.

Knights of RizalMaria Clara at Ibarra'' also received special citation from the Order of the Knights of Rizal during the organization's 23rd International Assembly for "bringing José Rizal's works [...] to a new generation, rekindling to them the ideals of freedom and nationalism for which all our heroes fought and died", as well as "making Rizal relevant and at the center again of our admiration and affection." Suzette Doctolero, J-mee Katanyag, and Brylle Tabora, the writers for the show, received the award at the assembly.

Notes

References

External links
 
 

2022 Philippine television series debuts
2023 Philippine television series endings
Filipino-language television shows
GMA Network drama series
Philippine fantasy television series
Television shows set in the Philippines
Portal fantasy